The Euphyes is genus of North American butterfly of the family Hesperiidae (skippers), subfamily Hesperiinae (grass skippers).

Species
The following species are recognised:
 Group peneia:
Euphyes peneia (Godman, [1900]) – guardpost skipper
Euphyes eberti Mielke, 1972 – Ebert's skipper
Euphyes leptosema Mabille, 1891 – leptosema skipper
Euphyes fumata Mielke, 1972 – fumata skipper
Euphyes singularis (Herrich-Schäffer, 1865) – singularis skipper [Butler's branded skipper (E. s. insolata) in Jamaica
Euphyes cornelius (Latreille, [1824]) – Cornelius skipper
 Group subferruginea:
Euphyes subferrugineus (Hayward, 1934) – subferrugineus skipper
Euphyes antra Evans, 1955 – Antra skipper
Euphyes cherra Evans, 1955 – Cherra skipper
 Group dion:
Euphyes bayensis Shuey, 1989 – bay skipper
Euphyes berryi (E. Bell, 1941) – Berry's skipper
Euphyes conspicua (W. H. Edwards, 1863) – black dash
E. c. buchholzi (P. Ehrlich and Gillham, 1951)
E. c. conspicua (W. H. Edwards, 1863)
E. c. orono (Scudder, 1872)
Euphyes dion (W. H. Edwards, 1879) – Dion skipper
Euphyes dukesi (Lindsey, 1923) – Dukes' skipper
E. d. calhouni Shuey, 1996
E. d. dukesi (Lindsey, 1923)
Euphyes pilatka (W. H. Edwards, 1867) – Palatka skipper or saw-grass skipper
E. p. klotsi L. Miller, Harvey and J. Miller, 1985
E. p. pilatka (W. H. Edwards, 1867)
 Group vestris:
Euphyes kiowah (Reakirt, 1866)
Euphyes k. chamuli Freeman, 1969 – Chamul skipper
Euphyes k. kiowah (Reakirt, 1866) 
Euphyes vestris (Boisduval, 1852) – dun skipper, sedge witch, or dun sedge skipper
E. v. harbisoni J. Brown and Mcguire, 1983
E. v. metacomet (T. Harris, 1862)
E. v. vestris (Boisduval, 1852)
Euphyes bimacula (Grote & Robinson, 1867) – two-spotted skipper
E. b. arbotsti Gatrelle, 1999
E. b. bimacula (Grote & Robinson, 1867)
E. b. arbotsti (Dodge, 1872)
Euphyes arpa (Boisduval & Le Conte, [1837]) – palmetto skipper
 Incertae sedis:
Euphyes ampa Evans, 1955 – ampa skipper
Euphyes canda (Steinhauser & Warren, [2002]) – Candelaria skipper

References

External links

Grass Skippers, Butterflies and Moths of North America
Hesperiidae, Butterflies of Canada

Hesperiinae
Hesperiidae genera
Taxa named by Samuel Hubbard Scudder